Álvaro Fernández Armero (born 6 March 1969) is Spanish film director, writer, producer and actor; who is known for El columpio (1993), Vergüenza (2017) and The Art of Dying (2000).

Early life
Álvaro Fernández Armero was born on 6 March 1969 in Madrid. He studied Philosophy and later was trained in different fields of cinematography.

Personal life
He has a sibling named Coloma Fernández Armero, who is a screenwriter.

Filmography

Awards and nomination

External links

1969 births
Living people
Spanish film directors
Spanish documentary film directors